Jozef Kotula (born 20 September 1976) is a Slovak former professional footballer who played as a right midfielder.

References

External links
 Eurofotbal profile
 
 Futbalnet profile

1976 births
Living people
People from Levice
Sportspeople from the Nitra Region
Slovak footballers
Association football defenders
FC Nitra players
Sportfreunde Siegen players
FC Petržalka players
FC Spartak Trnava players
SV Wilhelmshaven players
Rot-Weiss Essen players
Slovak Super Liga players
Slovak expatriate footballers
Slovak expatriate sportspeople in Germany
Expatriate footballers in Germany